Ronald J. Mellor (born September 30, 1940) is a distinguished professor of history at the University of California, Los Angeles. His area of research has been ancient religion and Roman historiography, where he has published a number of books.

Mellor attended Regis High School in New York City. He received his Ph.D. in Classics from Princeton University in 1968. His previous teaching posts include Stanford University. He has been a Visiting Fellow/Scholar at University College, London, the Humanities Research Centre of the Australian National University, the American Academy in Rome, and the Institute for Advanced Study in Princeton, New Jersey.

Bibliography
 Ronald Mellor, "θΕΑ ΡΩΜΗ: The Worship of the Goddess Roma in the Greek World"  Vandenhoeck & Ruprecht 1975
 Ronald Mellor, "From Augustus to Nero: The First Dynasty of Imperial Rome"  Michigan State Univ. Press 1989
 Ronald Mellor, "Tacitus"  Routledge 1992
 Ronald Mellor, "Tacitus: The Classical Tradition"    Garland Books/Routledge 1995
 Ronald Mellor, "The Roman Historians"  Routledge 1999
 Ronald Mellor, "Text and Tradition: Studies in Greek History and Historiography in Honor of Mortimer Chambers" (with L. Tritle) 1999 Regina Books
 Ronald Mellor, "The Ancient Roman World" (with Marni McGee) Oxford University Press 2004
 Ronald Mellor, "The World in Ancient Times: Primary Sources and Reference Volumes" (with Amanda Podany)  Oxford University Press 2005
 Ronald Mellor, "Augustus and the Creation of the Roman Empire"  St Martin's Press 2005
 Ronald Mellor, "Tacitus' Annals"  Oxford University Press 2010
 Ronald Mellor, "The Historians of Ancient World" Routledge 1997 (1st ed.); 2004 (expanded 2nd ed.); 2012 (expanded 3rd ed.)

References

External links
 Official biography

1940 births
Living people
Princeton University alumni
Stanford University faculty
University of California, Los Angeles faculty
21st-century American historians
21st-century American male writers
Historians of antiquity
Regis High School (New York City) alumni
Historians from New York (state)
Historians from California
American male non-fiction writers